Elisa Pérez Vera (born 1 June 1940) is a Spanish jurist, a professor of Private International Law at the National University of Distance Education (UNED) and magistrate of the Constitutional Court of Spain from 2001 to 2012. In 1982 she was appointed Rector of the UNED, becoming the first woman rector at a Spanish public university. The UNED has instituted the Elisa Pérez Vera Award to recognize research work on gender or feminism.

Career

She studied law at the University of Granada, graduating in 1961 and earning her doctorate in 1965. Since 1961 she has taught at the same university as an assistant professor, and since 1967 as an adjunct professor.

A specialist in international law, she was a member of the Spanish delegation in the United Nations special committee for the definition of aggression in Geneva. She participated as a speaker, adviser, and expert on various committees from 1971 to 1976 at the International Conference in The Hague.

From 1975 to 1979 she was an associate professor at the Autonomous University of Madrid, and a professor of the University of Santiago de Compostela for a few months. In 1979 she went on to hold the chair of Private International Law at the National University of Distance Education.

In 1982, she was elected rector of the UNED, becoming the first woman to attain this post at a Spanish public university.

At the proposal of the Spanish Socialist Workers' Party (PSOE) in the Congress of Deputies, she was appointed magistrate of the Constitutional Court in 2001, with a mandate that ended on 7 November 2010, but was extended until 2012 due to the absence of an agreement between the People's Party and the PSOE in the Congress of Deputies for the renewal of the four corresponding magistrates.

She was the initial rapporteur of the ruling on the Statute of Autonomy of Catalonia, composing five drafts favorable to the Statute that did not obtain the support of the plenary. Finally, in April 2010, after the first draft was rejected, she was replaced by President María Emilia Casas, with the presentation put in the charge of magistrate .

Pérez Vera was criticized for a questionable distribution of cases in the Constitutional Court, since a year and a half after the ruling on the Statute of Autonomy of Catalonia, issues related to the illegality of Bildu (and later of Sortu) were adjudicated, on which two drafts favorable to its legalization were issued, contrary to the Supreme Court's rulings, and which were approved by the plenary of the high court. The situation was made public by the president of the Community of Madrid, Esperanza Aguirre, who described the events of "shame" and harshly criticized the judgment for its defective technique, when entering into assessments of the facts and evidence, outside the jurisdiction of the Court.

Awards and distinctions
 Corresponding academic of the Royal Academy of Jurisprudence and Legislation
 Member of the Royal Academy of Jurisprudence and Legislation of Granada
 Namesake of the National University of Distance Education's award for research work on gender or feminism
 Dame of the Order of Isabella the Catholic
 Grand Cross of Aeronautical Merit (1985)
  (2003)
 Doctor Honoris Causa of the University of Alcalá (2014)
 Favorite daughter of the Province of Granada

Publications
 Derecho internacional privado : parte especial, 1973
 Naciones Unidas y los principios de la coexistencia pacífica, 1973
 Intereses del tráfico jurídico externo y derecho internacional privado, 1973
 Citoyenneté de l'Union européenne, nationalité et condition des étrangers, 2008

References

External links
 Elisa Pérez Vera at UNED

1940 births
20th-century Spanish women writers
21st-century Spanish women writers
Academic staff of the Autonomous University of Madrid
International law scholars
Living people
People from Granada
Recipients of the Order of Isabella the Catholic
Rectors of universities in Spain
Spanish academic administrators
21st-century Spanish judges
University of Granada alumni
Academic staff of the University of Granada
Academic staff of the University of Santiago de Compostela
Women jurists
Women heads of universities and colleges
Women legal scholars
Spanish women judges
21st-century women judges